Billingsley is a surname. Notable people with the surname include:

Andrew Billingsley, American sociologist and president of Morgan State University
Barbara Billingsley (1915–2010), American actress
Brent Billingsley (born 1975), American baseball pitcher
Chad Billingsley (born 1984), American baseball pitcher
Charles Billingsley (cricketer) (1910–1951), Irish cricketer
Franny Billingsley, American author of children's fantasy novels
Frederic C. Billingsley (1921–2002), American engineer
Henry Billingsley (died 1606), Lord Mayor of London and the first translator of Euclid into English
Hobie Billingsley, American diving champion
Jahleel Billingsley (born 2001), American football player
JoJo Billingsley, American singer, soloist, songwriter and recording artist
John Billingsley (born 1960), American actor
John Billingsley (agriculturist) (1747–1811), British agriculturist
Neil Billingsley, American child actor
Patrick Billingsley, (1925–2011), American mathematician and  actor
Peter Billingsley (born 1971), American actor, director, and producer
Ray Billingsley, American cartoonist, creator of Curtis
Ron Billingsley (born 1945), American football player
Sherman Billingsley (1900–1966), American nightclub owner and bootlegger
William Billingsley (aviator) (1887–1913), early aviator in the United States Navy
William Billingsley (artist) (1758–1828), English porcelain painter